Handelman is a surname. Notable people with the surname include:

Marc Handelman (born 1975), American painter
Max Handelman (born 1973), American sportswriter, producer, and blogger
Michelle Handelman (born 1960), American artist
Stanley Myron Handelman (1929–2007), American comedian and actor